Tuncel Tayanç Kurtiz (1 February 1936 – 27 September 2013) was a Turkish theatre, movie and TV series actor, playwright, and film director. Since 1964, he acted in more than 70 movies, including many international productions.

Early years
His father was a district governor (kaymakam) and his mother is of Bosniak descent a teacher. His parents' occupation was the reason the family toured many places across the country. After graduating from the Haydarpaşa High School in Istanbul, Kurtiz studied English philology at Istanbul University.

Career
He soon started a career as an actor playing theatres. Since 1958, Kurtiz performed on many stages in Istanbul, in state and private theatres. He was also on the stage at Gothenburg City Theatre, Stockholm Royal Theatre and Swedish Theatre in Sweden, Schaubühne Berlin, Frankfurt City Theatre and Hamburg City Theatre in Germany and at Peter Brook Shakespeare Royal Theatre in England. Kurtiz directed plays for the German-Turkish theatre project "Türkisches Ensemble" in the late 1970s.

During his university years and later the military service period, he became friends with the renowned film director Yılmaz Güney. They made a number of films together. Their 1970 film Umut was prohibited to leave Turkey, but was shown in Cannes Film Festival by a smuggled copy.

His first film role was in Şeytanın Uşakları, shot in 1964. Since then, Tuncel Kurtiz played also in many international productions like Swedish, German, Dutch, Italian, French, British, Israel and Indian films and TV series, mostly in the original language.

Death
Tuncel Kurtiz died at the age of 77 on 27 September 2013 following a fall-inflicted head trauma in his residence in Etiler, Istanbul.

Filmography

Movies 
  (Happy Family Journal) (2013)
  (Film Against All Odds) (2010)
 Black and White (2010)
 Pains of Autumn (2009)
  (2008)
 The Edge of Heaven by Fatih Akın (2007 - Turkey-Germany)
  (Esaretten Kaçış) by Carlo Mazzacurati (2002 - Italy)
 Gräfin Sophia Hatun by Ayşe Polat (1997 - Germany)
  by Ömer Kavur (1997)
  by Hiner Saleem (1997 - France)
 Somersault in a Coffin by Derviş Zaim (1996)
  by Konstantin Schmidt (1993 - Germany)
  by Ottokar Runze (1990 - Germany)
  by Anton Peschke (1990 - Germany)
  by Suzanne Osten (1990 - Sweden)
 The Mahabharata by Peter Brook (1989 - India)
  by Suzanne Osten (1989 - Sweden)
  by Shimon Dotan (1986 - Israel)
  by Otakar Votocek (1984 - Netherlands)
  by Mats Arehn (1983 - Sweden)
  (The Wall) by Yılmaz Güney (1983)
 On Fertile Lands by Erden Kıral (1980)
 Kanal by Erden Kıral (1978)
  (The Herd) by Zeki Ökten (1978)
  by Şerif Gören and Yılmaz Güney (1970)
  by İlhan Engin (1964)

TV series 
 Muhteşem Yüzyıl (2012-2013)
 Ezel (2009-2011)
 Asi (2007-2009)
 Kara Duvak (2007)
 Hacı (2006)
 "Vägen till Gyllenblå!" (1985 - Sweden)
 Tatort -  (1975 - West Germany)

Directed movie 
 Lyckliga vi... (1980 - Turkey/Sweden)

Awards 
 "Best Screenplay" at 1981 Antalya Film Festival for his script Gül Hasan
 "Best Actor" at the 36th Berlin International Film Festival for his role in the Israel film Hiuch HaGdi
 "Best Supporting Actor" at 1994 Antalya Film Festival for his role in Bir Aşk Uğruna
 "Best Actor" at 7th Sadri Alışık Awards for his role in Şellale
 "Best Supporting Actor" at 2007 Antalya Film Festival for his role in Yaşamın Kıyısında

References

External links 
 Zeytin Publishing - Interview with Tuncel Kurtiz 
 Biyografi.net - Biography of Tuncel Kurtiz 
 

1936 births
People from İzmit
Turkish people of Bosniak descent
Istanbul University alumni
Istanbul University Faculty of Law alumni
Turkish male film actors
Turkish male stage actors
Turkish film directors
Turkish male screenwriters
Best Screenplay Golden Orange Award winners
Best Supporting Actor Golden Orange Award winners
Best Supporting Actor Golden Boll Award winners
2013 deaths
Haydarpaşa High School alumni
Golden Orange Life Achievement Award winners
Silver Bear for Best Actor winners
Philologists
20th-century Turkish male actors
21st-century Turkish male actors
Turkish dramatists and playwrights
Turkish film producers
Accidental deaths from falls
Accidental deaths in Turkey
Neurological disease deaths in Turkey
Deaths from head injury
20th-century dramatists and playwrights
Turkish socialists